Molly Kathleen Ringwald (born February 18, 1968) is an American actress. She began her career as a child actress on the sitcoms Diff'rent Strokes and The Facts of Life (both 1979–1980) before being nominated for a Golden Globe for her performance in the drama film Tempest (1982). Ringwald became a teen idol following her appearances in filmmaker John Hughes teen films—appearing in Sixteen Candles (1984), The Breakfast Club (1985), and Pretty in Pink (1986). These films led to the media referring to her as a member of the "Brat Pack." Her final teen roles would be in For Keeps and Fresh Horses (both in 1988). 

Following leading roles in King Lear (1987), The Pick-up Artist (1987), Strike It Rich (1990), and Betsy's Wedding (1990), Ringwald moved to Paris and began acting in French films. In subsequent decades, Ringwald acted in television shows The Secret Life of the American Teenager (2008-2013), Riverdale (2017-present), Creepshow (2021), and Dahmer – Monster: The Jeffrey Dahmer Story (2022).

Early life 
Ringwald was born in Roseville, California, the daughter of Adele Edith (née Frembd), a chef, and Robert Scott "Bob" Ringwald, a blind jazz pianist of German descent. Ringwald has two siblings, Beth and Kelly, and an older brother, who died before she was born. She is partly of Swedish descent. She started her acting career at age five, appearing in a stage production of Alice in Wonderland as the Dormouse. The next year, she recorded "I Wanna Be Loved by You", a music album of Dixieland jazz with her father and his group, the Fulton Street Jazz Band.  Ringwald graduated from the Lycée Français de Los Angeles.

Career

1970s 
In 1978 at the age of 10, Ringwald was chosen to play Kate in the West Coast production of Annie, performing in Los Angeles.  In 1979, Ringwald appeared on the TV series Diff'rent Strokes and was selected to become part of the large cast of that show's spin-off, The Facts of Life. She played Molly Parker, a perky, feminist student at Eastland Girls School. At the beginning of the second season, the show underwent a major revamp, and most of the cast, including Ringwald, were cut from the show. Ringwald later said that Nancy McKeon replaced her to play a new character named Jo.

1980s 
In 1980, Ringwald performed as a lead vocalist on two Disney albums. On the patriotic album Yankee Doodle Mickey, Ringwald sang "This Is My Country", "The Star-Spangled Banner", and "God Bless America". She later performed one track, "The First Noel", on a Disney Christmas album, "Disney’s Christmas All-Time Favorites".  Turning toward motion pictures, she got a key supporting role in the 1982 film Tempest, directed by Paul Mazursky with top casting director Juliet Taylor, and was nominated for a Golden Globe award for the role.

Ringwald rose to prominence with her breakout role in Sixteen Candles (1984). She was cast as Samantha Baker, a girl whose sixteenth birthday is forgotten by her family. Ringwald's performance gained critical acclaim; many called her acting engaging. Ringwald would later say, "It is not a good idea to do remakes of great classic films" when asked if there would be a remake to Sixteen Candles. 
Ringwald was regarded as a member of the Brat Pack of 1980s teen actors but has said she was not really part of that group.
Ringwald gained more success when she was cast in another John Hughes film, The Breakfast Club (1985), which was a commercial and critical success. Ringwald was cast as Claire Standish, a spoiled, wealthy beauty  who is in detention for skipping class to go to the mall. Ringwald's performance gained strong reviews.

The following year, still in high school, she was cast as Andie Walsh in another successful Hughes film, Pretty In Pink (1986). When first asked to be in Pretty in Pink, Ringwald was reluctant, but after seeing how hard it was for the producers to find a replacement for her, she decided she would portray Andie in the film. Ringwald was offered a role in another John Hughes film, Some Kind of Wonderful (1987), but turned down the role as she felt it was too similar to the other films she worked on with Hughes. After Pretty In Pink, she wanted to act in more mature roles. Ringwald was featured on the cover of the May 26, 1986, issue of Time.

Ringwald was set to star in another Hughes film, Oil and Vinegar, but the film was scrapped when Hughes refused to rewrite the script. The film would have been about a soon-to-be-married man and a hitchhiking girl talking about their lives during the length of a car ride.  In 1987, she was cast as Randy Jensen in The Pick-up Artist, opposite Robert Downey, Jr. in one of his first lead roles. It focused on a womanizer who meets his match when he falls for a woman in debt to the Mafia. The film was met with mixed reviews while being a moderate commercial success.

The following year, she starred in For Keeps, a commercial success that received mixed reviews from critics but was well received by audiences. It is considered Ringwald's final teen movie. Ringwald portrayed Darcy Elliot, the editor at her high school paper, who becomes pregnant by her long-term boyfriend Stan, portrayed by Randall Batinkoff. Her performance received positive reviews. The film was praised by some critics for showing the struggles of teen pregnancy. She was later cast in Fresh Horses. The film was met with generally negative reviews and underperformed at the box office. The film also starred Andrew McCarthy, who previously worked with Ringwald in Pretty in Pink.

1990s 
In the early 1990s, Ringwald reportedly turned down the female lead roles in Pretty Woman and Ghost. In the mid-1990s, Ringwald, who had been educated at the Lycée Français de Los Angeles and is fluent in French, moved to Paris and starred in several French movies. She returned to the United States intermittently to appear in American movies and television. In 1990, Ringwald appeared in the James Scott-directed Strike It Rich alongside Robert Lindsay and John Gielgud. That same year she starred in Betsy's Wedding as Betsy Hopper. This film gained generally mixed reviews despite being a commercial success. Ringwald later starred in Something to Live for: The Alison Gertz Story (1992).

In 1994, she was cast as Frannie Goldsmith in the TV miniseries The Stand, an adaptation of Stephen King's 1978 novel of the same name. Ringwald's performance was generally well received. She next played the leading role in the film Malicious (1995) as Melissa Nelson, a disturbed woman who has an affair with a college star baseball player. She later starred in the ABC sitcom Townies. She appeared as a blind woman on the critically acclaimed cable series Remember WENN. She starred with Lara Flynn Boyle and Teri Hatcher in the 1998 made-for-television film Since You've Been Gone. In 1999, she played the starring role of "Li'l Bit" in Paula Vogel's play How I Learned to Drive at the Mark Taper Forum in Los Angeles. In 2000, she appeared in an episode of Showtime's The Outer Limits, "Judgment Day".

2000s 
In 2000, Ringwald appeared in the ensemble restaurant-themed film In the Weeds, and in 2001 she had a cameo in the commercially successful Not Another Teen Movie that earned her a MTV Movie Award nomination. In theater, she wore a "Green, Green Dress" as Susan in Jonathan Larson's Off-Broadway musical tick, tick... BOOM!, and headlined as Sally Bowles in Broadway's long-running revival of Cabaret from December 18, 2001, until April 28, 2002. In 2003, Ringwald appeared in Enchanted April on Broadway beginning April 8, but left after the performance of June 15 due to her pregnancy with her daughter.

In late 2004, she starred in the play Modern Orthodox on Broadway, opposite Jason Biggs and Craig Bierko. In 2006 she starred in the television film The Wives He Forgot, and that fall and winter starred as Charity Hope Valentine in the national tour of the Broadway revival of the musical Sweet Charity. She also played a supporting role as Molly McIntire's mother Helen in Molly: An American Girl on the Home Front. Ringwald starred in the ABC Family network's series The Secret Life of the American Teenager, which debuted on July 1, 2008, and ran for five seasons and 121 episodes, before ending on June 3, 2013. She played Anne Juergens, the title teenager's mother.

2010s 
Ringwald read the audiobook edition of the 2012 novel The Middlesteins by Jami Attenberg. In early 2013, Ringwald released Except Sometimes, a jazz record. It follows a tradition in jazz for the Ringwald family set by her father. "I grew up in a home filled with music and had an early appreciation of jazz since my dad was a jazz musician. Beginning at around age three I started singing with his band and jazz music has continued to be one of my three passions along with acting and writing. I like to say jazz music is my musical equivalent of comfort food. It's always where I go back to when I want to feel grounded," Ringwald said in a statement.

Ringwald played Madame Frechette in the 2014 Lifetime Christmas film Wishin' and Hopin'. Ringwald plays Aunt Bailey in Jem and the Holograms, raising Jerrica, her sister Kimber, and adopted daughters.  In September 2014, Ringwald began writing an advice column for The Guardian, answering questions about "love, family, or life in general". In 2016, she was cast as Amy in the crime-drama film King Cobra. Ringwald currently has a recurring role as main character Archie Andrews' mother Mary Andrews on The CW television series Riverdale. After initially only appearing as a guest, Ringwald has taken a more prominent role in the series following the death of Luke Perry who played Archie's father.

In 2019 Ringwald made her debut as a translator, providing the English translation of the French novel Lie With Me by Philippe Besson.

Personal life 
Ringwald married Valéry Lameignère, a French writer, in Bordeaux, France, on July 28, 1999; they divorced in 2002.  She married Panio Gianopoulos, a Greek-American writer and book editor, in 2007. They have a daughter, born in 2003 and fraternal boy-girl twins, born in July 2009. Her pregnancy was written into the storyline of The Secret Life of the American Teenager. She was the subject of an episode in season 7 of the genealogy series Who Do You Think You Are?.

Public image 
Ringwald stated she was very aware of her public image during her teen years and she tried to be a good role model for her fans. When asked about For Keeps (1988), Ringwald said, "I didn't want to give the wrong message to teenagers. I sort of felt a certain responsibility – I mean, I was a very, very famous teenager and I thought a lot of teenagers were looking up to me and emulating me, and I really didn't want to make a movie that said in any way that having a baby at that age was going to be easy."

Bibliography 

 Getting the Pretty Back: Friendship, Family, and Finding the Perfect Lipstick (2010)
 When It Happens to You: A Novel in Stories (2012)
 Lie With Me (2019) by Philippe Besson, as translator

Filmography

Film

Television

Discography 
 Except Sometimes (2013)
 Going Home Alone (2013)

References

External links 

 
 
 
 

1968 births
21st-century American novelists
Actresses from California
American child actresses
American expatriates in France
American female dancers
American dancers
American women jazz singers
American jazz singers
American film actresses
21st-century American memoirists
American musical theatre actresses
American people of German descent
American people of Swedish descent
American stage actresses
American television actresses
American feminists
American women novelists
Living people
Lycée Français de Los Angeles alumni
People from Roseville, California
Oakmont High School alumni
20th-century American actresses
21st-century American actresses
21st-century American women writers
American women memoirists
Novelists from California
Jazz musicians from California